Pennsauken Creek is a  tributary of the Delaware River in Burlington and Camden counties, New Jersey in the United States.

Pennsauken Creek drains  of southwestern Burlington County and northern Camden County and joins the Delaware River near Palmyra.

The North Branch of the Pennsauken is in Burlington County, while the South Branch forms the boundary between Burlington and Camden counties. The tide affects the  main stem and the first few miles up the branches. Both the North and South branches are approximately 10 miles long.

The Pennsauken Creek faces problems from agricultural and urban runoff, as well as wastewater treatment facilities. Landfills are also a source of contamination for the Pennsauken Creek, as well as industrial pollution near the mouth of the river's main stem.

Etymology
The name of the creek, "Pennsauken," most likely came from "Pemisoakin," a Native American village in the area.

Tributaries
North Branch Pennsauken Creek
South Branch Pennsauken Creek

See also
 List of rivers of New Jersey

References

Rivers of Burlington County, New Jersey
Rivers of Camden County, New Jersey
Rivers of New Jersey
Tributaries of the Delaware River
Pennsauken Township, New Jersey